"Give Me Peace on Earth" is the second single from Modern Talking's fourth album In the Middle of Nowhere. It was released on November 11, 1986 and was of moderate success peaking only at No. 29 in Germany and No. 28 in Austria.

Singles
7" single (1986)
 "Give Me Peace on Earth" – 4:12
 "Stranded in the Middle of Nowhere" – 4:31

12" maxi-single	(1986)
 "Give Me Peace on Earth" – 4:12
 "Stranded in the Middle of Nowhere" – 4:31
 "Sweet Little Sheila" (Bonus track) – 3:04

Chart position

References

External links

Peace songs
Modern Talking songs
1986 singles
Songs written by Dieter Bohlen
Song recordings produced by Dieter Bohlen
Pop ballads
1986 songs